Medina House is a former Turkish bath on the seafront of Hove, Sussex, England. After falling into disuse it was squatted for several years. During this period Sirus Taghan, the then owner, agreed that the occupants could remain so long as the property was kept in the same condition as before occupation. The squatters were eventually evicted in September 2006, although the property was re-occupied for a week at the end of January 2007.

Taghan submitted several applications to demolish the building. However, these were all turned down by the council and also opposed by local residents. There was a fire in the building May 2013, and again in December 2014, after which the site became increasingly derelict. The novelist Polly Samson, the wife of Pink Floyd guitarist David Gilmour, purchased the building in 2015 and it was demolished with the plan to build a new home for herself and Gilmour on the site in 2018. The new building on the site was completed in 2021.

History
Medina House was built in 1894 as a ladies' turkish bath. An adjacent building housed a ladies' swimming pool, although that has since been demolished. It was built for the Hove Bath and Laundry Company to the design of the architect P. B. Chambers.

As part of Kings Esplanade, it now forms part of the Cliftonville Conservation Area within Hove. Its listing describes it as a "Strange and whimsical building" that "Possesses some charm and character as well as historical significance."

During the Second World War it saw service as a makeshift hospital.

Previously owned by Hove Borough Council, it was at the end tenanted from the 1940s to 1994 by a firm of diamond cutters, Monnickendam, who tried to buy the premises from the council and were refused.  Around the time that Hove Borough Council was merged with Brighton Council to form the Brighton and Hove unitary authority 1997–8, they instead sold it for circa £300,000 to Sirus Taghan.

21st century 
In 2001, the building was occupied by a group of artists known as the Chalk Circle who used the space for artist development, community workshops and exhibitions. Their aim was to create a 'free space' that the local community could use for whatever they thought most appropriate. Though initially the rent paid to the landlord was minimal (£1 per year) this was gradually increased to £20 per tenant per week. In the summer of 2006 the house became divided into drug addicts and non-addicts. Consequently, internal conflicts arose, most of the non-addicts left and the rent ceased to be collected. It was occupied until September 2006, when the residents were evicted due to non-payment of rent. The court ordered the eviction. The residents appealed against the decision but were eventually evicted. City councillors had been campaigning for four years due to local complaints about noise and rubbish.

In 2007, the building was briefly squatted for about two weeks.One morning, Elijah Smith opened the door to the fire brigade and police who escorted them. The police kicked electric sockets inside the building, causing them to become a fire hazard. Under this pretext the squatters were evicted and a fire prohibition order was then placed on the building.

Development 
Following purchase in the late 1990s, Sirus Taghan obtained planning consent for a low-rise small development which would have seen Medina House demolished.  Whilst the Royal Doulton-tiled main bath house area was part demolished and the pool filled in with concrete along the way, the consent was allowed to lapse and ideas of putting a tall building on the site have instead proliferated ever since (unsuccessfully).

One idea, for a 'spinning plates' tower, appeared on the front page of the local newspaper, The Argus.  A local architect recognised it as having been inspired by a development in Scandinavia. No planning application was submitted to BHCC for this proposal.

Sirus Taghan has wanted to demolish Medina House and build a new tower block. He first put in a planning application for an 18-storey building in 2002, but this was rejected. Subsequently, he planned a smaller tower but never put in a formal application. Taghan's 2006 proposal for Sirus Tower, a 12-storey building which would house 25 flats, also failed to gain planning consent. Taghan claimed that the building is structurally unsound.

Enforcement notices 
Following receipt of a letter from the Hove MP, Mike Weatherley, in January 2011, Brighton and Hove City Council opened an Enforcement file.  A six-months s215 notice was raised in November 2011, a one-month extension granted soon after and the deadline of 1 June 2012 passed without compliance.  At the time of writing a 2nd s215 notice was to be raised concerning refuse within the bath area and a letter was to be sent advising the owners of the council's position:  prosecution and/or repairs by the council to be recharged to the owners and asking them what their position is.

Demolition 
A fire occurred in the afternoon of Friday 31 May 2013. The cause is unclear. Another fire occurred in the evening of Saturday 20 December 2014. The initial assessment by the fire service was that the cause was arson.

The novelist Polly Samson and the guitarist David Gilmour purchased the building in late 2015. After the fires, view of the surveyors was that Medina House was damaged beyond repair. A plan to erect a new structure which echoes the old one was approved. The Victorian building was demolished in April 2018.

Gallery

References

Bibliography

1894 establishments in England
Buildings and structures in Brighton and Hove
Houses completed in 1894
Demolished buildings and structures in England
Evicted squats
Former public baths
Public baths in the United Kingdom
Squats in the United Kingdom
Buildings and structures demolished in 2018